Zee Thirai is an Indian Tamil-language pay television channel which broadcasts Tamil movies 24x7. Launched on 19 January 2020 and owned by Zee Entertainment Enterprises (ZEEL). Zee Thirai offering Latest Blockbuster Kollywood Premiere Movies.Now Vani Bhojan is a Brand Ambassador Of This Channel.

Launching
This Movie Channel was released by actor Kamal Haasan at the grand stage of Zee Cine Awards Tamil 2020 under the network Zee Entertainment Enterprises Limited (ZEEL) of Zee Tamil. Also it is the sixth channel in the Southern region by the network and the second movie channel in the south. HD Feed of this channel is launched.

Films

List of some films broadcast by Zee Thirai

16 Vayathinile (1977) 
Kizhakke Pogum Rail (1978)
Kadavul Amaitha Medai (1978)
Bhuvana Oru Kelvi Kuri (1978)
Varumayin Niram Sivappu (1980)
Rishimoolam (1980)
Thangaikkor Geetham (1983)
Uyirullavarai Usha (1983)
Uravai Kaatha Kili (1984)
Kanmaniye Pesu (1985)
Mythili Ennai Kaathali (1986)
Lakshmi Vandhachu (1986)
Oru Thayin Sabhatham (1987)
En Thangai Kalyani (1988)
Samsara Sangeetham (1989)
Varam (1989)
Shanti Enathu Shanti (1991)
Enga Veetu Velan (1992)
Petredutha Pillai (1993)
Pattukottai Periyappa (1994)
Thai Thangai Paasam (1995)
Makkal Aatchi (1995)
Vidukathai (1997)
Thulli Thirintha Kaalam (1998)
Kaatrukkenna Veli (2001)
Aayul Regai (2005)
Jadhi (2005)
Ilavattam (2006)
Nenjil Jil Jil (2006)
Lakshyam - Oru Thaayin Aasai (2007)
En Uyirinum Melana (2007)
Inimey Nangathan (2007)
Yaarukku Yaaro (2007)
Madurai Veeran (2007)
Varenda Maduraikku (2007)
Sutta Pazham (2008)
Kadhal Endral Enna (2008)
Dubai Rani (2008)
Arasangam (2008)
Kaalaippani (2008)
Vallamai Tharayo (2008)
Pandhayam (2008)
Kathi Kappal (2008)
Nadigai (2008)
Kodaikanal (2008)
Aadum Koothu (2008)
Pathu Pathu (2008)
Saamida (2008)
Madurai Ponnu Chennai Paiyan (2008)
Ragasiya Snehithane (2008)
Theeyavan (2008)
Kadhal Kaditham (2008)
Sadhu Miranda (2008)
Thodakkam (2008)
Azhagu Nilayam (2008)
Akku (2008)
Valluvan Vasuki (2008)
Sila Nerangalil (2008)
Kattuviriyan (2008)
Chakkara Viyugam (2008)
Iyakkam (2008)
Nadigai (2008)
Silandhi (2008)
Ennai Theriyuma (2009)
Anthony Yaar? (2009)
Aarumugam (2009)
Jaggubhai (2010)
Maargazhi 16 (2011)
Haridas (2013)
Samar (2013)
Soodhu Kavvum (2013)
Ponmaalai Pozhudhu (2013)
Ambikapathi (2013)
Vaayai Moodi Pesavum (2014)
Megha (2014)
Kappal (2014)
Meimarandhen Paaraayo (2015)
Rajini Murugan (2016)
Balloon (2017)
Meyaadha Mann (2017)
Kodiveeran (2017)
Thiruttu Payale 2 (2017)
7 Naatkal (2017)
Savaari (2017)
En Aaloda Seruppa Kaanom (2017)
Bayama Irukku (2017)
Kanavu Variyam (2017)
Savaari (2017)
Doraa (2017)Podhuvaga Emmanasu Thangam (2017)Vikram Vedha (2017)Mom (2017)Ivan Thanthiran (2017)8 Thottakkal (2017)Maragatha Naanayam (2017)Peechankai (2017)Mersal (2017)Padaiveeran (2018)Bhaagamathie (2018)Mannar Vagaiyara (2018)Vidhi Madhi Ultaa (2018)Onaaigal Jakkiradhai (2018)Bhaskar Oru Rascal (2018)Diya (2018)En Peru Surya En Veedu India (2018)Mohini (2018)Junga (2018)Irumbu Thirai (2018)Lakshmi (2018)2.0 (2018)Raja Ranguski (2018)Kolamavu Kokila (2018)Marainthirunthu Paarkum Marmam Enna (2018)Billa Pandi (2018)Kalavani Mappillai (2018)Aan Devathai (2018)Thodraa (2018)Kanaa (2018)Nadigayar Thilagam (2018)
Kuthoosi (2019)
Sigai (2019)
Irandam Ulagaporin Kadaisi Gundu (2019)
Kennedy Club (2019)
Nerkonda Paarvai (2019)
Kudimagan (2019)
Chennai Palani Mars (2019)
Gorilla (2019)
Kalavani 2 (2019)
House Owner (2019)
Thumbaa (2019)
Pancharaaksharam (2019)
Dhanusu Raasi Neyargale (2019)
Market Raja MBBS (2019)
Sindhubaadh (2019)
Lisaa (2019)
Devi 2 (2019)
 Aakasha Ganga 2 (Tamil 2019) Boomerang (2019)Thirumanam (2019)Vantha Rajavathaan Varuven (2019)Dhilluku Dhuddu 2 (2019)Thittam Pottu Thirudura Koottam (2019)Saaho (2019)Oh My Kadavule (2020)Naan Sirithaal (2020)V (2020 film) (2020)Cocktail (2020)Danny (2020)Ka Pe Ranasingam (2020)Silence (2022)Idhu Ennoda Jilla (2021)Tuck Jagadish (2022)Karnan (2021)Valimai (2022)Radhe Shyam (2022)Kallan (2022)Enna Solla Pogirai (2022)Veerame Vaagai Soodum (2022)K.G.F: Chapter 2 (2022)Veetla Vishesham (2022)Maa Manidhan (2022)Yaanai (2022)My Dear Bootham (2022)Captain'' (2022)

References

External links

Television stations in Chennai
Tamil-language television channels
Foreign television channels broadcasting in the United Kingdom
Zee Entertainment Enterprises
Television channels and stations established in 2020
2020 establishments in Tamil Nadu
Movie channels in India